A Man's Reach is an autobiography by Elmer Andersen, the former governor of Minnesota, published by the University of Minnesota Press in 2000.

“Andersen’s story is the Horatio Alger myth made real, but his life is about much more than money and politics. He believes in public service, in democracy, and in striving to meet the needs of all citizens, especially those in the worst circumstances. Andersen’s strong faith and values resonate from the first page of this autobiography. His writing is honest, personable, straightforward, portraying both the personal rigor and thoughtfulness of his business and newspaper careers.” —St. Paul Pioneer Press

“Andersen and his skillful editor Sturdevant have produced a book that refreshes the spirit by reminding us of the possibilities of a life devoted to the service of others. This delightful memoir will rejuvenate the faith of all who believe in the value of honesty and the power of perseverance harnessed to a noble cause.” —Minnesota History

"A Man's Reach is a book that warms the heart and should inspire any reader to be a better person. It's also the detailed account of the life of a very successful businessman, politician, and most important, a great humanitarian. . . . It's simply but forcefully told, it's shrewd, and it's quietly humorous and warm." —Dave Wood's Book Report

References
Andersen, Elmer A Man's Reach  University of Minnesota Press, 2000.  

Political autobiographies